Craig Stapleton may refer to:
Craig Roberts Stapleton (born 1945), U.S. ambassador
Craig Stapleton (rugby league) (born 1978), Australian rugby league footballer